The Pakistan national cricket team toured the West Indies from January to March 1958 and played a five-match Test series against the West Indies cricket team which the West Indies won 3–1. Pakistan were captained by Abdul Hafeez Kardar; West Indies by Gerry Alexander. The series was noted for high-scoring feats with Hanif Mohammad scoring 337 in 970 minutes at Bridgetown and then Garfield Sobers scoring a then world record 365 not out at Sabina Park. Sobers shared a second wicket partnership of 446 with Conrad Hunte who scored 260.

Test series summary

First Test

Second Test

Third Test

Fourth Test

Fifth Test

References

External links

1958 in Pakistani cricket
1958 in West Indian cricket
1957-58
International cricket competitions from 1945–46 to 1960
West Indian cricket seasons from 1945–46 to 1969–70